M-Beat (born Marlon Hart) is a jungle musician and producer. He scored three top 20 hit singles on the UK Singles Chart: "Incredible" (featuring General Levy) at No. 8, "Sweet Love" (a cover of the Anita Baker song featuring Nazlyn) at No. 18 (both from 1994), and "Do U Know Where You're Coming From" (featuring Jamiroquai) at No. 12 in 1996. His father is Junior Hart, owner of hardcore and jungle label Renk Records.

Discography

Albums
Wicked Album (1994), Renk
Knowledge (1996), Renk

References

External links

English drum and bass musicians
Black British musicians
English record producers
Living people
Year of birth missing (living people)